"Marie Laveau" is a song written by Shel Silverstein and Baxter Taylor. First recorded by Dr. Hook & The Medicine Show on their 1971 album Doctor Hook, a 1974 live recording by Bobby Bare went to number one for a single week and spent a total of 18 weeks on the country charts. It was his 34th single on the charts, his only number one and final top ten country hit.

The song is about a fictitious and ugly witch who lived in the Louisiana bayous in a hollow log with a one-eyed snake and a three-legged dog, having the same name as the famous New Orleans voodoo priestess, and who, armed with a magic black cat tooth and mojo bone, could make men disappear with a horrific screech. On the night of a new moon, "Handsome Jack" arrives and offers her a deal: if she conjures up $1,000,000 for him, he will marry her. After he receives the money, he backs out of the deal claiming that she is too ugly for a rich man like him; in retaliation, she screeches and Jack disappears.

Other recorded versions are by Girl Trouble on their album Thrillsphere (1990) and The Blue Dogs on Music for Dog People (1991).

Chart performance

References

 

1971 songs
Bobby Bare songs
Dr. Hook & the Medicine Show songs
Songs written by Shel Silverstein
1974 singles
RCA Records singles
Songs about witches